The 1946–47 Hong Kong First Division League season was the 36th since its establishment.

Overview
Sing Tao won the title.

References
RSSSF

Hong Kong First Division League seasons
Hong
football